The 2015–16 Atlantic Coast Conference men's basketball season began with practices in October 2015, followed by the start of the 2015–16 NCAA Division I men's basketball season in November. Conference play started in late December 2015 and will conclude in March with the 2016 ACC men's basketball tournament at the Verizon Center in Washington, D.C.

Preseason

Rankings

Regular season

Conference matrix
This table summarizes the head-to-head results between teams in conference play. Each team will play 18 conference games, and at least 1 against each opponent.

Postseason

ACC tournament

  March 8–12, 2016 Atlantic Coast Conference Basketball Tournament, Verizon Center, Washington, D.C.

* Denotes Overtime Game

AP Rankings at time of tournament

NCAA tournament

National Invitation tournament

Honors and awards

NBA Draft

The ACC had 9 players drafted in the 2016 NBA draft.  4 players were drafted in the first round, and 5 players were drafted in the second round.

References